The winners of the 1998 Governor General's Literary Awards were announced by Jean-Louis Roux, Chairman, and Shirley L. Thomson, Director of the Canada Council for the Arts on November 17 in Ottawa.  Each winner received a cheque for $10,000.

English-language finalists

Fiction
Diane Schoemperlen, Forms of Devotion
Lynn Coady, Strange Heaven
Barbara Gowdy, The White Bone
Wayne Johnston, The Colony of Unrequited Dreams
Kerri Sakamoto, The Electrical Field

Poetry
Stephanie Bolster, White Stone: The Alice Poems
Louise Bernice Halfe, Blue Marrow
Michael Ondaatje, Handwriting
Lisa Robertson, Debbie: An Epic
Kathy Shaidle, Lobotomy Magnificat

Drama
Djanet Sears, Harlem Duet
Bruce McManus, Selkirk Avenue
Richard Sanger, Not Spain
Sandra Shamas, Sandra Shamas: A Trilogy of Performances
David Young, Inexpressible Island

Non-fiction
David Adams Richards, Lines on the Water: A Fisherman's Life on the Miramichi
Wayne Grady, The Quiet Limit of the World: A Journey to the North Pole to Investigate Global Warming
Charlotte Gray, Mrs. King: The Life and Times of Isabel Mackenzie King
Judy Schultz, Mamie's Children: Three Generations of Prairie Women
Rudy Wiebe and Yvonne Johnson, Stolen Life: The Journey of a Cree Woman

Children's literature (text)
Janet Lunn, The Hollow Tree
Gayle Friesen, Janey's Girl
Julie Johnston, The Only Outcast
Janet McNaughton, Make or Break Spring
Sarah Withrow, Bat Summer

Children's literature (illustration)
Kady MacDonald Denton, A Child's Treasury of Nursery Rhymes
Victor Bosson, The Fox's Kettle
Harvey Chan, Music for the Tsar of the Sea
Zhong-Yang Huang, The Great Race
Stéphane Jorisch, The Village of a Hundred Smiles and Other Stories

Translation (from French to English)
Sheila Fischman, Bambi and Me
Arnold Bennett, Voltaire's Man in America
David Homel, The Second Fiddle
Daniel Sloate, Aknos and Other Poems

French-language finalists

Fiction
Christiane Frenette, La Terre ferme
Marie-Célie Agnant, Le Silence comme le sang
Madeleine Gagnon, Le Deuil du soleil
Nancy Huston, L'Empreinte de l'ange
Pierre Samson, Un garçon de compagnie

Poetry
Suzanne Jacob, La Part de feu preceded by Le Deuil de la rancune
Hugues Corriveau, Le Livre du frère
Hélène Dorion, Les Murs de la grotte
Christine Richard, L'Eau des oiseaux
Michel van Schendel, Bitumes

Drama
François Archambault, 15 secondes
Serge Boucher, Motel Hélène
Olivier Choinière, Le Bain des raines
Carole Fréchette, La Peau d'Élisa
Suzanne Lebeau, L'Ogrelet

Non-fiction
Pierre Nepveu, Intérieurs du Nouveau Monde : Essais sur les littératures du Québec et des Amériques
Chantal Bouchard, La Langue et le Nombril : Histoire d'une obsession québécoise
Marcel Olscamp, Le Fils du notaire Jacques Ferron 1921-1949 : Genèse intellectuelle d'un écrivain
Régine Robin, Le Golem de l'écriture : De l'autofiction au Cybersoi
Patricia Smart, Les Femmes du Refus global

Children's literature (text)
Angèle Delaunois, Variations sur un même «t'aime»
Guy Dessureault, Lettre de Chine
Daniel Mativat, Terreur sur la Windigo
Danielle Rochette, La Fugue d'Antoine
Hélène Vachon, Le Cinéma de Somerset

Children's literature (illustration)
Pierre Pratt, Monsieur Ilétaitunefois
Stéphane Poulin, Petit zizi
Alain Reno, Un tartare pour le bonhomme Sept Heures
Yayo, Le Chasseur d'arc-en-ciel

English-to-French translation
Charlotte Melançon, Les Sources du moi : La Formation de l'identité moderne
Paule Noyart, Leonard Cohen : Le Canadien errant
Hélène Rioux, Self

Governor General's Awards
Governor General's Awards
Governor General's Awards